Hajji Hemmatlu (also Romanized as Ḩājjī Hemmatlū) is a village in Kandovan Rural District, Kandovan District, Meyaneh County, East Azerbaijan Province, Iran. At the 2006 census, its population was 183, in 49 families.

References 

Populated places in Meyaneh County